

The Laredo Convent Avenue Port of Entry is located at the Gateway to the Americas International Bridge (sometimes referred to as "Bridge I" or "Old Bridge" or "Convent Avenue Bridge").  Since 1889, a bridge connected Laredo, Texas with Nuevo Laredo, Tamaulipas at this location.  For many years, this was the only crossing for vehicular and pedestrian traffic between the two cities.

History
In 1889, eight years after the first railroad bridge was constructed connecting two cities, the "Foot and Wagon Bridge" was built, enabling pedestrians and horse-drawn carriages to cross the border. This bridge was destroyed by a tornado and subsequent flood in 1905, and again by a mysterious fire in 1920.  It was destroyed again by floods in 1932 and 1954.  During each reconstruction, temporary pontoon bridges were built to accommodate traffic.  The current bridge was completed in 1955.  The construction of the Amistad Dam in 1969 has mitigated the effect of subsequent flooding conditions.  It wasn't until 1976 that a second bridge was built to further connect the two cities.

The U.S. Inspection Station building that was built in 1943 was listed on the U.S. National Register of Historic Places in 1992.

See also

 List of Mexico–United States border crossings
 List of Canada–United States border crossings
 National Register of Historic Places listings in Webb County, Texas

References

External links

Mexico–United States border crossings
National Register of Historic Places in Webb County, Texas
Government buildings on the National Register of Historic Places in Texas
1898 establishments in Texas
Buildings and structures in Laredo, Texas